The 1959 Paris–Nice–Rome was the 17th edition of the Paris–Nice cycle race and was held from 4 March to 14 March 1959. The race started in Paris and finished in Rome. It was the only time the race covered this route from Nice to Rome. The race was won by Jean Graczyk of the Helyett team.

General classification

References

1959
1959 in road cycling
1959 in French sport
March 1959 sports events in Europe
1959 Super Prestige Pernod